Samuel Sawny is a retired Grenadian middle-distance runner who represented his country at the 1984 Summer Olympics in the men's 800 metres.

References

Living people
Grenadian male middle-distance runners
Olympic athletes of Grenada
Athletes (track and field) at the 1984 Summer Olympics
Year of birth missing (living people)